Chris Carpenter (born 1975) is a retired American baseball pitcher.

Chris Carpenter may also refer to:

 Cris Carpenter (born 1965), baseball player
Chris Carpenter (baseball, born 1985)
Chris Carpenter (sound engineer)

See also
Christine Carpenter (disambiguation)
Christopher Carpenter (disambiguation)